Phillip Lane Wellman (born December 5, 1961 in Marlin, Texas), is an American professional baseball coach and manager. He is the current manager of the El Paso Chihuahuas, Triple-A affiliate of the San Diego Padres of Major League Baseball. Wellman attended Sam Houston State University and Southwestern University.

Managerial career
Wellman began his coaching career with the 1988 Pulaski Braves. He was a coach in the Atlanta Braves system from 1988 to 1991, including 1990 with the Burlington Braves and 1991 with the Durham Bulls.

Wellman managed outside of the Braves organization from 1992–2003, with the exception of 2000, when he was a coach for the minor league Louisville RiverBats. He returned to the Braves as the hitting coach for the Greenville Braves in 2004-2005, and the Mississippi Braves in 2006. Wellman was the skipper of Mississippi from 2007-2010.

After the Mississippi Braves finished the 2010 season with a 63-74 record, Wellman's contract was not renewed. He joined the Springfield Cardinals of the Texas League, Double-A affiliate of the St. Louis Cardinals, as hitting coach, and served three years (2011–2013) in that post before his appointment as manager of the Travelers, who also play in the Texas League. He left the Travelers at the end of the season and worked for a trucking company in Chattanooga, Tennessee. Wellman returned to minor league baseball in 2016 as manager of the San Antonio Missions. As of the end of the 2019 season, Wellman is still with the Padres organization, managing the Amarillo Sod Poodles.

Umpire altercation and tirade
On June 1, Wellman gained international attention when he went on a tirade against the umpires during a game against the Chattanooga Lookouts at AT&T Field. He protested the umpire throwing his pitcher out of the game for using a foreign substance by covering home plate with dirt, then tracing in the dirt a new, significantly larger home plate. He then went on to uproot bases and throw them, crawl in a prone position across the infield like a soldier, and pretend to bite and hurl the rosin bag at an umpire as if it were a hand grenade. He concluded his tirade by pretending to eject the umpires themselves with a fist-pump and then blowing a farewell kiss to the crowd while taking a bow. The episode was broadcast on sports shows across the United States and gained him widespread fame on the Internet. Wellman was given a three-game suspension effective June 4, 2007. The Braves reappointed Wellman manager of the Mississippi Braves on December 7, 2007.

In March 2009, ESPN showed the top-10 meltdowns in sports history and judged Wellman's to be #1. Upon showing the clip, Hannah Storm said “and there he goes, never to be seen from again.” Co-anchor Josh Elliott added “end of his career.”
However, this was incorrect. He was still the manager and on September 13, 2008 he led the Mississippi Braves to the Southern League championship beating the Carolina Mudcats 3-2 in the 10th inning of the decisive Game 5.
He was also brought up to the major league Atlanta Braves team for a couple of weeks in September 2008, tradition for top minor league managers in the Braves organization.

On May 26, 2016 in a game against the Northwest Arkansas Naturals he was ejected after protesting a runner called out. Before being ejected he stood in what appeared to be a military parade rest position, before throwing the rosin bag as a grenade. Upon being ejected by the umpire he first kicked the second base then pulled the base from the ground and walked away with it. He then tossed the base in front of the San Antonio Missions dugout before walking off the field.

Managerial records

See also
Bobby Cox
Joe Mikulik
Lou Piniella

References

External links

Atlanta Braves Press Release on MLB.com: Braves suspend Mississippi manager Phillip Wellman

1961 births
Living people
Anderson Braves players
Durham Bulls players
Harrisburg Senators players
Kenosha Twins players
Chattanooga Lookouts managers
People from Marlin, Texas
San Antonio Missions managers
Southwestern University alumni
Sumter Braves players